Porozina is a small port town in Croatia, located on the northwest coast of Cres. It is connected by ferry to Brestova (Kršan municipality) on the Istria mainland.

The old town is situated upon a hillock above the port, and in the last two decades a new holiday neighbourhood has been built.

History 

In the Classical era there was a lighthouse on the hillock above the port, that is how the town got its name (Pharum insulae).

On this site today we find ruins of an old Franciscan monastery of Saint Nicholas and an old Gothic church, dating to the 15th century. The monastery was used by Franciscan Glagolitic monks of the third order, who managed to preserve Old Church Slavonic as a liturgy language even up to the 13th century. The monastery edifice was abandoned in 1843, when it was also partly demolished. Its ruins manifest characteristics of the renaissance architecture.

The church was victim of many robberies, and it was almost burnt to the ground in the 16th century. Remarkably, it withstood all those perils and it stands well preserved even today. Among its many distinct features are Glagolitic inscriptions on its walls.

Geography 

The settlement is situated in a cove on the north of the island. The cove offers good natural protection from all the winds, so this spot was the only one suitable for docking from time immemorial.

References

Populated places in Primorje-Gorski Kotar County
Cres